Massone is an Italian surname. Notable people with the surname include:

 Carina Massone (1911–1991), Italian aviator
 Nicoletta Massone, Canadian film and television costume designer
 Pier Paolo Brega Massone, Italian doctor and convicted serial killer
 Carlo Massone, Italian sailor

Italian-language surnames